Aleks Paunovic (born June 29, 1969) is a Canadian actor. Some of his many roles include prospector Jim McAllister on drama TV series Arctic Air, Julius on fantasy horror drama series Van Helsing, imposing warrior Wygar Oak on the second season of Dirk Gently's Holistic Detective Agency and Bojan "Boki" Boscovic on dystopian thriller series Snowpiercer.

Biography
Paunovic is from Winnipeg, Manitoba, and "three generations of fighters" are in his family. His father is of Serbian descent, and his mother is of Croatian ancestry. His grandfather, father and uncle were all champion boxers in Yugoslavia, and he was a champion boxer until a shoulder injury ended his career. Paunovic was in a rock band before he got an acting job at his first audition. He supports the Red Cross/Impact Anti-Bullying Campaign, as he had been bullied as a child.

Filmography

Film

Television

Web

Awards and nominations
For his role of Julius in Van Helsing Paunovic has been nominated 3 times for Leo awards: in 2018 - Best Lead Performance by a Male: Dramatic Series, in 2019 - Best Supporting Performance by a Male: Dramatic Series, and in 2022 - Best Lead Performance by a Male: Dramatic Series.

References

External links

Living people
Canadian male film actors
Canadian male television actors
Male actors from Winnipeg
Canadian people of Serbian descent
Canadian people of Croatian descent
1969 births